Karthavyam is a 1990 Indian Telugu-language political action film directed by Mohan Gandhi, starring Vijayashanti. Written by Paruchuri Brothers, the film is loosely based on the real-life story of police officer Kiran Bedi.

Made on a budget of 90 lakh, the film was a commercial success, grossing over  7 crore. Vijayashanti won the National Film Award as Best Actress for her performance in this film. The film was premiered at the 14th International Film Festival of India in the mainstream section.

The film was subsequently dubbed into Tamil as Vyjayanthi IPS, which was also a huge success at the box office. The film was remade in Hindi as Tejaswini (1994) with Vijayashanti reprising her role, and later in Tamil as Bhavani (2011).

Cast

Awards
 1990 - National Film Award for Best Actress - Vijayashanti
 1990 - Filmfare Award for Best Actress – Telugu - Vijayashanti
 1990 - Filmfare Award for Best Film - Telugu - A. M. Rathnam
 1990 - Nandi Award for Best Actress - Vijayashanti 
 1990 - Nandi Award for Best Story Writer - Paruchuri Brothers

References

External links

1990 films
Fictional portrayals of the Andhra Pradesh Police
1990s Telugu-language films
Films featuring a Best Actress National Award-winning performance
Indian action drama films
1990s action drama films
Films scored by Raj–Koti
1990s police procedural films
Films set in Andhra Pradesh
Films about real people
Action drama films based on actual events
1990s political films
Telugu films remade in other languages
Political action films